Fordham University School of Law is the law school of Fordham University. The school is located in Manhattan in New York City, and is one of eight ABA-approved law schools in that city. In 2013, 91% of the law school's first-time test takers passed the bar exam, placing the law schools' graduates as fifth-best at passing the New York bar exam among New York's 15 law schools.

According to Fordham University School of Law's 2014 ABA-required disclosures, 67.8% of the Class of 2014 obtained full-time, long-term, JD-required employment nine months after graduation. Fordham was ranked as the 37th best law school in the United States and 3rd for part-time law by U.S. News & World Report 2023 ranking and 24th globally in the 2021 edition of the Shanghai Ranking. In 2021, Above the Law magazine ranked Fordham 23rd among U.S. law schools for scholarly impact. For 2022 Above the Law ranked Fordham 28th among the top 50 law schools.

Overview 
According to the information reported to the American Bar Association, 1,151 J.D. students attended Fordham Law in 2015–2016. There are 956 full-time students and 195 part-time students. Fordham Law also offers Master of Laws (LL.M.) degrees in the following specializations: Banking, Corporate, & Finance Law; Corporate Compliance; Fashion Law; Intellectual Property & Information Technology Law; International Business & Trade Law; International Dispute Resolution; International Law & Justice; and U.S. Law.  LL.M. students can take a second concentration after finishing the first one by enrolling in a third semester. Fordham University offers a "3-3 Program" that allows students to earn a Bachelor of Arts or Bachelor of Science and a Juris Doctor in six years of study: three at Fordham College and three at Fordham Law. Fordham Law offers three joint degrees in conjunction with Fordham University's other graduate schools:  J.D./M.A. in International Political Economy and Development; J.D./M.B.A.; and J.D./M.S.W.

The School also offers a Master of Studies in Law (M.S.L.) degree with specializations in Corporate Compliance and Fashion Law, as well as a Doctor of Juridical Science (S.J.D.) degree, which is full-time, research-based and culminates in a dissertation of at least 50,000 words.

Founded in 1905, Fordham Law commemorated its Centennial during the 2005–2006 academic year, and capped the year-long celebration with an alumni gala on Ellis Island on September 28, the school's official birthday. The school used the occasion of its Centennial to launch a new fundraising drive in 2005, and in just one year had raised more than $10 million thanks in large part to the more than 100 "Centennial Founders" who each contributed $100,000 or more.

The current dean of Fordham Law School is Matthew Diller.

Statistics

For 2021, 17.69% of applicants to Fordham Law were accepted. Of those accepted 31.28% enrolled. The average full time Fordham Law student had a LSAT score of 166 and an undergraduate GPA of 3.71, while the average part time student had a LSAT score of 163 and an undergraduate GPA of 3.62.

In the 2022 edition of U.S. News & World Report'''s "Best Graduate Schools," Fordham Law was ranked 35th. It has the highest ranked part-time law program in New York state (ranked 2nd in the nation in the 2021 edition.) Additionally, five specialty programs were nationally ranked: Dispute Resolution, 13th; Trial Advocacy, 13th; International Law, 15th; Intellectual Property, 16th; and Clinical Training, 22nd.

In 2020, The National Law Journal ranked Fordham Law 4th nationally in terms of placement of 2018 graduates in the 25 largest law firms of the largest legal market, which is New York. It is placed 15th nationally in terms of placement of 2018 graduates in top 100 law firms. This is an improvement from four years earlier when it ranked 20th and 23rd in comparative rankings. In a survey conducted by Vault in 2017, Fordham Law comes 8th in terms of big law placement and 9th when class size was factored in.

Public Legal placed Fordham Law among the top 23 law schools for the highest median salaries along with Harvard, Yale, Columbia, Chicago, NYU, UC-Berkeley, Duke, Cornell, UPenn, Georgetown and 12 others. 

According to the American Universities Admission Program's LL.M Rankings, the Fordham Law LL.M program was ranked 6th nationally in 2012. In 2015, 85.2% of the law school's first-time test takers passed the bar exam, placing the law school graduates as fourth-most successful New York State bar exam takers among New York's 15 law schools.

In a national study of the scholarly impact of law school faculty citations between 2010 and 2014, Fordham Law's tenured professors were tied for 35th.

Campus
Originally located in New York's downtown Financial District, Fordham Law is currently located on the West Side of Manhattan, as part of Fordham University's Lincoln Center campus. As part of the university's Lincoln Center Master Plan, unveiled in 2005, a new law school building was built. The building took three years to complete, following the groundbreaking on May 2, 2011. The new law school building is part of the university's Phase 1 redevelopment of its Lincoln Center Campus.

The 22-story building was designed by Pei Cobb Freed & Partners to serve a dual-purpose for Fordham University: a nine-story pedestal (and lower-level floor) houses the law school, and a 12-story tower serves as an undergraduate residence hall.

The law school portion of the building was dedicated on September 18, 2014. Former New York City mayor Michael R. Bloomberg delivered the keynote address and U.S. Supreme Court Associate Justice Sonia Sotomayor also gave a speech before presiding over the ribbon-cutting ceremony.

Academics

Legal Writing Program
Fordham offers an extensive legal writing program, with many course offerings beyond the first year. All legal writing courses are taught by adjunct professors.

Clinical Education
The Clinical education program at Fordham Law is ranked 22nd nationally by U.S. News & World Report in its 2016 edition of America's Best Graduate Schools. At Fordham, clinical education is available but not required. Students are selected for clinics via a competitive application process. Fordham students have an opportunity to enroll in clinics following their first year, and after taking the Fundamental Lawyering Skills course. Currently, 17 clinics are offered:

 Appellate Litigation
 Community Economic Development
 Consumer Litigation
 Corporate Social Responsibility
 Criminal Defense
 Entrepreneurial Law
 Family Advocacy
 Federal Litigation
 Immigrant Rights
 International Human Rights
 International Law & Development in Africa
 Legislative and Policy Advocacy
 Mediation
 Queens DA Prosecution
 Presidential Succession
 Samuelson-Glushko Intellectual Property and Information Law
 Securities Litigation & Arbitration
 Tax

Fordham's clinics represent clients as "Lincoln Square Legal Services," a small law firm housed within the school.

Crowley Program in International Human Rights
The Crowley Program in International Human Rights, named after the late Professor Joseph R. Crowley, was founded in 1997. It is a program of study in international human rights law undertaken in the 2L year, culminating in a two-week overseas fact-finding mission in the summer. Students in the program are known as Crowley Scholars.

Leitner Center
The Leitner Center for International Law and Justice works with students and with social justice organizations both locally and internationally to advocate for human rights.

Public Interest Resource Center
Fordham's Public Interest Resource Center (PIRC) serves as the clearinghouse for student community service and pro bono work, and hosts 19 student-run organizations, including Habitat for Humanity, Unemployment Action Center, Just Democracy, and others. PIRC earned Fordham Law the American Bar Association's 2008 Pro Bono Publico Award, making Fordham Law only the second university winner in the award's history.

Stein Scholars
The PIRC also runs the competitive Stein Scholars Program in Public Interest Law and Ethics, in which selected students train for a career in the public sphere and receive funding for doing unpaid public interest work.

Student publications
Students at Fordham Law publish six nationally recognized law journals. According to a study by Washington & Lee University, among journals published 2007–2014, they are ranked among the most cited in judicial opinions as follows:
 Fordham Law Review 6th-most cited among all law journals
 Fordham Intellectual Property, Media & Entertainment Law Journal 6th-most cited of all IP journals
 Fordham Urban Law Journal 5th-most cited student-edited public policy journal
 Fordham Journal of Corporate & Financial Law 1st-most cited student-edited banking and finance journal

In addition, the study found that four of Fordham Law School's specialty law reviews are among the top ten most cited journals by law reviews in their respective specialty fields.
 Fordham Environmental Law Review 10th-most cited of all environmental law journals
 Fordham Urban Law Journal 2nd-most cited of all public policy journals
 Fordham Journal of Corporate & Financial Law 1st-most cited among all banking and finance journals
 Fordham Intellectual Property, Media & Entertainment Law Journal 3rd-most cited of all IP journals
 Fordham International Law Journal 
 4th-most cited among student-edited international journals

Notable faculty
Notable faculty include Matthew Diller, Toni Jaeger-Fine, Rebecca Kysar, Joseph Landau, Ethan Lieb, John Pfaff, Olivier Sylvain, and Zephyr Teachout. Visiting and adjunct professors include federal appeals judge Denny Chin, Jewish law scholar Daniel Sinclair, and election law experts Jurij Toplak and Jerry Goldfeder.

 Notable alumni 

Numerous notable attorneys, judges, prosecutors, politicians, and diplomats are among the notable Fordham Law graduates, including Chief Judge of the United States Court of Appeals for the Second Circuit Irving Kaufman, and Denny Chin, a current U.S. Court of Appeals for the Second Circuit judge.

Over 650 judges are Fordham Law graduates.

In 1924, Ruth Whitehead Whaley graduated, at the top of her class, who later became the first African-American woman admitted to the state bars of New York and North Carolina.

Governor of New York Malcolm Wilson, New York City Mayor Vincent R. Impellitteri, and United States Attorney General John N. Mitchell are Fordham Law graduates. Ten members of the U.S. House of Representatives are Fordham Law graduates including Thomas Suozzi, Thomas Vincent Quinn, Bill Owens, Jerrold Nadler, Vito Fossella, Geraldine Ferraro, Francis E. Dorn, Dan Donovan, and Steven Derounian.

Among the sports personalities were World Light Heavyweight champion Bob Olin, New York Giants President John Mara, General Manager of the Philadelphia Eagles Howie Roseman, and Walter O'Malley, owner of the Brooklyn Dodgers who moved the team from Brooklyn to Los Angeles.

 In popular culture 
 George Clooney's title character in the film Michael Clayton (2007) is a graduate of Fordham Law.
Peter Scanavino's character Detective Dominick Carisi in Law and Order: Special Victims Unit attended Fordham Law School's night classes, passed his bar exam in 2016, and became a District Attorney.
In 2022, Kelli Giddish's character Amanda Rollins in Law and Order quits the detective work and becomes a professor at Fordham Law.

 Employment 
According to Fordham Law's official 2014 ABA-required disclosures, 80% of the Class of 2014 were employed full-time 10 months after graduation; 67.8% were in full-time, long-term, JD-required positions; 11.1% held positions the ABA classifies as "J.D. Advantage" (defined by NALP as "legal training is deemed to be an advantage or even necessary in the workplace"); and 20.7% were employed in public sector positions in government, nonprofit organizations, and judicial clerkships. Fordham Law's Law School Transparency under-employment score is 20.3%, indicating the percentage of the Class of 2014 unemployed, pursuing an additional degree, or working in a non-professional, short-term, or part-time job nine months after graduation.

The law school was ranked # 21 of all law schools nationwide by the National Law Journal'' in terms of sending the highest percentage of 2015 graduates to the largest 100 law firms in the US (19.5%).

Costs
The 2015-2016 tuition at Fordham Law is $53,440 for full-time J.D. students and $40,080 for part-time J.D. students; the estimated fees, room and board, and other expenses total $27,996 for full-time and $27,906 for part-time students (not including a $2,529 student health insurance charge, which the school will waive for students who have alternative health insurance coverage). The Law School Transparency estimated debt-financed cost of attendance for three years is $296,077.

See also
 Law of New York
 Law school in the United States

References

External links 

 
 FLASH: Fordham Law Archive of Scholarship and History (Institutional Repository)

Fordham University School of Law
Law School
Catholic law schools in the United States
Law schools in New York City
Universities and colleges in Manhattan
Educational institutions established in 1905
1905 establishments in New York City
Upper West Side